Lovčice may refer to places in the Czech Republic:

Lovčice (Hodonín District)
Lovčice (Hradec Králové District)